Vivien Yeo  (born 20 July 1984) is a Malaysian Chinese actress and businesswoman. She represented Malaysia at the 2004 Miss Chinese International Pageant and made her acting debut in the 2004 youth drama series Sunshine Heartbeat. She is best known for her roles in Ghost of Relativity (2015) and The Learning Curve of a Warlord (2018).

Yeo is the founder of Vivien Yeo's Beauty Store, a cosmetics store with locations in Malaysia, Singapore, and Hong Kong.

Personal life
Yeo got married with her out-of-industry boyfriend in 2019. In April 2020, she announced that she had given birth to a daughter in Malaysia. On 14 February 2022, Yeo announced on Instagram that she had given birth to her second daughter.

Filmography

Television

Film

Awards
(2003) Miss Astro Chinese International winner (Miss Photogenic, Miss Elegance, Miss Fresh Look, Best Figure Award)
(2004) Top five finalist in Miss Chinese International 2004 pageants

Reference

External links
 Official TVB Blog of Vivien Yeo
 Official Yahoo! Blog of Vivien Yeo
 
 

1984 births
Living people
TVB actors
21st-century Hong Kong actresses
Malaysian actresses
Malaysian people of Hokkien descent
Malaysian people of Chinese descent
Vivien Yeo
Malaysian born Hong Kong artists